The Combat League of Revolutionary National Socialists (German: Kampfgemeinschaft Revolutionärer Nationalsozialisten, KGRNS), more commonly known as the Black Front, was a political group formed by Otto Strasser in 1930 after he resigned from the Nazi Party (NSDAP) to avoid being expelled.

Strasser formed the Black Front to continue what he saw as the original anti-capitalist stance of the Nazi Party, embodied in several items of its 1920 25-point Program that was in large part ignored by Adolf Hitler, which Strasser saw as a betrayal. The Black Front was composed of former radical Nazis who intended to cause a split in the party. The group published a newspaper, The German Revolution. The Black Front adopted the crossed hammer and sword symbol which is still used by several Strasserite groups. 

The Black Front, which never had more than a couple of thousand members, was unable to effectively oppose the Nazis. Hitler’s rise to power as Chancellor of Germany proved to be the final straw. The remaining anti-capitalist elements of the Nazis were eradicated in 1934 during the Night of the Long Knives, in which Gregor Strasser, Otto's older brother, was killed. Strasser had previously broken with his brother over Otto's proclivity to act on his own. Otto Strasser spent the years of the Third Reich in exile, first in Czechoslovakia and later in Canada.

See also 
 National Bolshevik Party
 Socialist Reich Party
 Strasserism

References

1930 establishments in Germany
1933 disestablishments in Germany
Banned far-right parties
Far-right political parties in Germany
Fascist organizations
German nationalist organizations
German nationalist political parties
Nazi parties
Organizations disestablished in 1933
Organizations established in 1930
Political organisations based in Germany
Strasserism
Syncretic political movements
Third Position